Sukhpal Singh Ahluwalia (born October 1958) is a British-Indian businessman and entrepreneur based in London.

He is founder and Non-Executive Chairman of Dominvs Group, a real estate, hospitality and asset management company. Ahluwalia also is founder and former Executive Chairman of car parts distributor Euro Car Parts.

Early life 
Born in Kampala, Uganda into an Indian Sikh family, Ahluwalia’s parents emigrated to the UK when Ahluwalia was 13 years old to escape persecution under Idi Amin in 1972. When they arrived in the UK, the family spent a year in temporary shared accommodation.

As a teenager, Ahluwalia spent time in the markets of Petticoat Lane and Liverpool Street.

Career

Euro Car Parts 

Ahluwalia founded Euro Car Parts in 1978 after borrowing £5,000 from his father and bank loan to buy a car parts shop in Willesden, London. The shop, originally called Highway Autos, was renamed Euro Car Parts a year later.

In 1981, Ahluwalia opened a second branch of the company in the Willesden area. The company originally supplied car parts for BMW, Mercedes, Porsche and VW vehicles. The company expanded to become the leading suppliers of parts, paints and equipment for cars and light commercial vehicles in the UK.

By 2011, Euro Car Parts employed 3,500 people across 89 locations. In October 2011, Ahluwalia sold Euro Car Parts to LKQ Corporation for £280 million, with a supplementary £55 million if targets were met. After the sale, Ahluwalia became Executive Chairman of LKQ Corporation's businesses in the UK, Ireland and India, but stepped down from the board in December 2018.

Personal life 
He is married to Rani Ahluwalia and they have three sons who are also involved in the businesses.

As of May 2018, Ahluwalia is the fourth richest refugee in the UK. According to The Sunday Times Rich List 2019, the Ahluwalia family have a net worth of £500 million.

Ahluwalia plans to move to India in the future.

References 

1958 births
Living people
Ahluwalia
British people of Indian descent
British people of Punjabi descent
British Sikhs
Indian Sikhs
British businesspeople of Indian descent
Entrepreneurship in India
British founders of automobile manufacturers